Pascual Baburizza (also known as Pasquale baburizza or Pasko Baburica Šoletić) (Calamotta, Austro-Hungarian Empire, now Koločep, Croatia, 1875– Los Andes, Chile, 1941) was a Croatian businessman established in Chile during the late 19th and 20th century.

He moved to Chile in 1892 with his brother Vittorio (Vicko), establishing in Iquique city, where were dedicated to saltpeter mining operations. Later, he began to expand their properties coming control of the supply chain of buying and selling of nitrate in the region until 1928 due to saltpeter crisis. Then, he invested in agricultural societies, being the most prominent San Vicente Agricultural Company in Los Andes, and Agricultural Society Rupanco Ñuble.

After death
His art collection was left to the city of Valparaíso, and his former residence Palacio Baburizza now serves as a museum.  Most of his land and capital were left to the National Botanic Garden of Chile.

References
La vida de un croata: Pascual Baburizza Soletic. Memoria Chilena .

1875 births
1941 deaths
Chilean businesspeople
Chilean people of Croatian descent
Naturalized citizens of Chile
Koločep
Emigrants from the Austro-Hungarian Empire to Chile